Cerithiopsis cruzana is a species of sea snail, a gastropod in the family Cerithiopsidae, which is known from the Caribbean Sea and the Gulf of Mexico. It was described by Usticke in 1959.

Description 
The maximum recorded shell length is 5 mm.

Habitat 
Minimum recorded depth is 55 m. Maximum recorded depth is 101 m.

References

cruzana
Gastropods described in 1959